Savelli is a comune and town in the province of Crotone, in Calabria, southern Italy, located within the Sila National Park.

It was founded in 1638 by Carlotta Savelli, a noblewoman of the Roman family of the Savelli.

Twin towns
 Albano Laziale, Italy
  Grant Town, United States

Cities and towns in Calabria
Populated places established in 1638
1638 establishments in Europe